Atanas Ivanov (Bulgarian: Атанас Иванов; born 5 May 1990)  is a Bulgarian footballer who plays as a midfielder.

External links 
 

1990 births
Living people
Bulgarian footballers
Association football midfielders
First Professional Football League (Bulgaria) players
PFC Pirin Gotse Delchev players
PFC Vidima-Rakovski Sevlievo players
FC Septemvri Sofia players
Sportspeople from Pazardzhik